KELT-3 is a star in the zodiac constellation Leo. With an apparent magnitude of 9.82, it is too faint to be seen with the naked eye, but can be detected using a telescope. It is currently located around 690 light years away, based on parallax measurements.

Properties 
KELT-3 is an early F-type main-sequence star with 27.7% more mass than the Sun, and is slightly larger than the latter. It is radiating 3 times the Sun's luminosity, and has a metallicity similar to the latter. It has an effective temperature of 6,304 K, which gives KELT-3 a yellow-white hue. It's also slightly younger than the Sun, with an age of 3 billion years. There is uncertainty about the star's age, it being an evolved star or not.

Since 2015, the star is suspected to have a stellar companion, at angular separation of 3.762 arcseconds.

Planetary System 
In 2013, KELT discovered an eccentric hot Jupiter transiting the star. In the research paper, it is stated as one of the brightest transiting hosts. The light curves of the star have been observed during transits.

References 

Planetary transit variables
Planetary systems with one confirmed planet
F-type main-sequence stars
BD+41 2024
J09543439+4023170
TIC objects
Leo (constellation)